Sekiya Station (関屋駅) is the name of multiple train stations in Japan:

 Sekiya Station (Nara)
 Sekiya Station (Niigata)
 Keisei-Sekiya Station